Logan is a former provincial electoral division in the Canadian province of Manitoba. It was created by redistribution in 1956, and existed until 1989. It was named after its main thoroughfare, Winnipeg Route 47, locally called Logan Avenue.

The riding was located in the north-central region of Winnipeg, and included some of the city's poorest communities. After redistribution in 1989, some of its territory went to the riding of Point Douglas.

In 2011, Logan was re-created out of the parts of the ridings of Wellington, Minto, Fort Rouge, and Point Douglas.

List of provincial representatives

Electoral results

References

Former provincial electoral districts of Manitoba
Politics of Winnipeg